Oedipus Tex is a satirical Western-themed oratorio by P. D. Q. Bach that follows the adventures of Oedipus Tex ("you may have heard of my brother Rex") in Thebes Gulch. It was released on the album, Oedipus Tex and Other Choral Calamities in 1990.

Structure
Oedipus Tex is a dramatic oratorio for soloists, chorus and orchestra with the following scenes.
I. Prologue: "Tragedy"
Recitative: "Well"
II. Aria with chorus: "Howdy there"
Recitative: "And it wasn't long"
III. Duet with chorus: "My heart"
Recitative: "But"
IV. Aria: "You murdered your father"
Recitative: "When Billie Jo heard"
V. Aria with chorus: "Goodbye"
Recitative: "When Oedipus heard"
VI. Chorus and Finale

Performers
 Professor Peter Schickele, conductor, bass (Title Character)
 The Greater Hoople Area Off-Season Philharmonic, Newton Wayland, conductor
 The Okay Chorale
 Grandmaster Flab and the Hoople Funkharmonic
 Pamela South, soprano (Billie Jo Casta)
 Dana Krueger, mezzo-soprano (Madame Peep)
 Frank Kelley, tenor
 Brice Andrus, horn

References 
 The Peter Schickele/ P.D.Q. Bach Webpage
 Oedipus Tex at Amazon.com

P. D. Q. Bach
Oratorios
Satirical works
Musical parodies